is a Japanese football player who plays for Urawa Red Diamonds in J1 League.

Club statistics
Updated to 4 December 2021.

Honours

Club
Urawa Red Diamonds
Japanese Super Cup: 2022

References

External links
Profile at Kashima Antlers

1993 births
Living people
Association football people from Shizuoka Prefecture
Japanese footballers
J1 League players
J2 League players
Shimizu S-Pulse players
Matsumoto Yamaga FC players
Kashima Antlers players
Urawa Red Diamonds players
Association football defenders